Tika Ram Paliwal (24 April 1909 – 8 February 1995) was an Indian politician, who served as the Chief Minister of Rajasthan from 3 March 1952 to 31 October 1952.

Paliwal was born at Mandawar, Rajasthan village in the present-day Mandawar tehsil of dausa district. He was a prominent Indian independence activist. He was a minister in Jai Narayan Vyas government form 26 April 1951 to 2 March 1952. He became the chief Minister of first democratically elected Rajasthan Legislative Assembly as Jai Narayan Vyas lost in the elections. Later Jai Narayan Vyas got elected in by-election from Kishangarh and again took over the post on 1 November 1952. So Tika Ram Paliwal resigned from the Cabinet for a short period and re-joined it.

He was MLA from Mahuwa twice in 1952 and 1957. In 1962, he was elected from the Hindaun Lok Sabha constituency as independent candidate.

References

External links
 Democratic Governments of Earlier Rajasthan (Interim Governments)
 History of Dausa

1909 births
1995 deaths
Chief Ministers of Rajasthan
Rajasthani people
India MPs 1962–1967
Lok Sabha members from Rajasthan
Chief ministers from Indian National Congress
Deputy chief ministers of Rajasthan
Rajya Sabha members from Rajasthan
People from Dausa district
Indian National Congress politicians from Rajasthan